Robert William Donald (10 March 1894 – 16 May 1962) was an Australian rules footballer who played with St Kilda and Essendon in the Victorian Football League (VFL).

Notes

External links 
		

1894 births
1962 deaths
Australian rules footballers from Melbourne
St Kilda Football Club players
Essendon Football Club players
Golden Point Football Club players
People from Richmond, Victoria